Devadasu may refer to:

 Devadasu (1953 film), a 1953 Indian Telugu-Tamil bilingual film
 Devadasu (1974 film), a 1974 Telugu film
Devadasu Malli Puttadu, a 1978 Telugu film
 Devadasu (2006 film), a 2006 Telugu film

See also 
 Devdas (disambiguation)